Baorangia is a fungal genus in the family Boletaceae. It was circumscribed by Chinese mycologists Gang Wu and Zhu L. Yang in 2015 with B. pseudocalopus (formerly classified in Boletus) as the type species. Baorangia emilei and B. bicolor were transferred to the genus from Boletus that same year. The erection of Baorangia follows recent molecular studies that outlined a new phylogenetic framework for the Boletaceae. The generic name—derived from the Chinese words bao ("thin") and rang ("hymenium")—refers to the characteristically thin hymenophore, which distinguishes it from all other Boletaceae genera.

References

Boletaceae
Boletales genera